Print Hall is a four level bar/restaurant at Brookfield Place in Perth, Western Australia. Opened in 2012, and housed in the former headquarters of Perth's daily newspaper, The West Australian, it has been described by The New York Times in 2014 as "... one of the city's most celebrated new restaurants, ... featuring soaring ceilings and a bright white atrium."
The establishment features Print Hall Bar, Print Hall Dining Room, The Apple Daily Bar and Eating House, Bob's Bar and Small Print Baker and Roastery.

Menu
Signature dishes at Print Hall include an entree of manna crab with Avruga, served with toasted brioche, raw quail yolk, radish and aioli; and an entree of rare-roasted pigeon breast with radicchio, beetroot, seared chicken liver and shredded pigeon leg.

Reception
The restaurant was given a one star rating, and the award for Best New Restaurant, by The West Australian Good Food Guide 2014.

In 2015, the restaurant was the recipient of the Wine Spectator Grand Award.

See also

Australian cuisine
C Restaurant
Greenhouse (restaurant)
Western Australian wine

References

External links
Print Hall – official site
Australian Traveller: Print Hall, Perth – review
Gourmet Traveller: Print Hall Bar & Dining Room – review 
The Australian: Print Hall pumps up the volume – review by John Lethlean
The West Australian: Stop the presses! Patience pays off for second edition – review by Rob Broadfield

Culture in Perth, Western Australia
Restaurants in Western Australia
Restaurants established in 2012
2012 establishments in Australia